Gillian Eastoe (born 5 August 1955) is an Australian singer and children's entertainer. Her album Extra Awesome Intergalactical Expedition Into the Far Reaches and Back was nominated for the ARIA Award for Best Children's Album in 1996 but lost to The Wiggles' Wake Up Jeff!.

Biography
In the 1970s, Gillian previously performed with her band King Dog. They performed on Countdown in 1979.

Discography

Studio albums
Jellybean Jar (1990) – ABC Music
Insects and Bugs (1992) – ABC Music
Extra Awesome Intergalactical Expedition into the Far Reaches and Back (1996) – ABC Music

Singles
"Somebody Who Loves You" (1978) – Philips
"Isn't It Funny" (1981) – Mercury

Video albums
Extra Awesome Intergalactical Expedition into the Far Reaches and Back (1996) – ABC Video

"Something About You" (Gillian Eastoe and King Dog) (1979) – Mercury

Awards and nominees

ARIA Music Awards

References

Living people
Australian women singers
Australian children's musicians
1955 births